Gompholobium laxum is a species of flowering plant in the family Fabaceae and is endemic to the south-west of Western Australia. It is an erect, open shrub with needle-shaped leaves and uniformly yellow, pea-like flowers.

Description

Taxonomy
This species was first formally described in 1864 by George Bentham, who gave it the name Gompholobium aristatum var. laxum in Flora Australiensis. In 2008, Jennifer Anne Chappill raised the variety to species status as Gompholobium laxum in Australian Systematic Botany. The specific epithet (laxum) means "open", referring to the long pedicels.

Distribution and habitat
Gompholobium laxum grows in woodland in the Avon Wheatbelt, Esperance Plains, Jarrah Forest and Mallee biogeographic regions of south-western Western Australia.

Conservation status
Gompholobium laxum is classified as "not threatened" by the Western Australian Government Department of Parks and Wildlife.

References

laxum
Eudicots of Western Australia
Plants described in 1864
Taxa named by George Bentham